Os Gigantes is a Brazilian telenovela produced and broadcast by TV Globo. It premiered on 20 August 1979 and ended on 2 February 1980, with a total of 143 episodes. It's the twenty third "novela das oito" to be aired on the timeslot. It is created and written by Lauro César Muniz and directed by Régis Cardoso and Jardel Mello.

Cast 
 Dina Sfat - Paloma Gurgel
 Francisco Cuoco - Francisco Rubião (Chico)
 Tarcísio Meira - Fernando Lucas
 Susana Vieira - Veridiana Gurgel
 Joana Fomm - Vânia Lucas
 Vera Fischer - Helena
 Mário Lago - Antônio Lucas
 Lauro Corona - Polaco
 Lídia Brondi - Renata
 Jonas Mello - Victor
 Rogério Fróes - Dr. Osvaldo
 Castro Gonzaga - Amadeu
 Flora Geny - Ivone
 Miriam Pires - Eulália Gurgel
 Norah Fontes - Matilde
 Perry Salles - Novak
 Cleyde Blota - Selma
 Fábio Mássimo - Ciro
 Mayara Norbin - Ana
 Lúcia Alves - Maria Lúcia
 Hemílcio Fróes - Jaime
 Denny Perrier - Murilo
 Carlos Gregório - Father Justino
 Ênio Santos - Milton
 Solange Theodoro - Cristina
 Átila Iório - Pedro
 Esther Mellinger - Maria
 Julciléa Telles - Teresa
 Marcos Waimberg - Salvador
 Milton Villar - José
 Ivan de Almeida - Eugêni
 Borges de Barros - Onofre
 Lilian Fernandes - Marli
 Aguinaldo Rocha - Aníbal
 Gilda Sarmento - Carminha
 Ana Maria Sagres - Creusa

References 

TV Globo telenovelas
1979 telenovelas
Brazilian telenovelas
1979 Brazilian television series debuts
1980 Brazilian television series endings
Portuguese-language telenovelas